The 2009–10 season was the 62nd season in the existence of FC Steaua București and the club's 62nd consecutive season in the top flight of Romanian football. In addition to the domestic league, Steaua București participated in this season's edition of the Cupa României and the UEFA Europa League.

Previous season positions

Players

Squad information

|-
|colspan="12"|Players from Steaua II
|-

|-
|colspan="12"|Players sold or loaned out during the season
|-

Transfers

In

Out

Spending
Summer:   €1.8 million

Winter:   €0 million

Total:    €1.8 million

Income
Summer:   €2 million

Winter:   €0.37 million

Total:    €2.37 million

Statistics

Player stats

|-
|colspan="15"|Players from Steaua II
|-

|-
|colspan="15"|Players sold or loaned out during the season
|-

Goalscorers
Key

Last updated:15:05, 23 May 2010 (UTC) 
Source: FCSB

Start formations

Starting XI

Squad stats
{|class="wikitable" style="text-align: center;"
|-
!
!Total
!Home
!Away
|-
|align=left| Games played ||48 ||23 ||25
|-
|align=left| Games won    ||25 ||13 ||12
|-
|align=left| Games drawn  ||13 || 6 || 7
|-
|align=left| Games lost   ||10 || 4 || 6
|-
|align=left| Biggest win  || 3–0 vs Motherwell  3–0 vs St Patrick's || 3–0 vs Motherwell  3–0 vs St Patrick's || 4–2 vs Gaz Metan  3–1 vs Motherwell  2–0 vs Ceahlăul  2–0 vs Bacău  2–0 vs Iași  2–0 vs Internațional
|-
|align=left| Biggest lose || 5–1 vs Rapid ||  3–1 vs Ceahlăul || 5–1 vs Rapid
|-
|align=left| Clean sheets    || 21  ||  11 || 10
|-
|align=left| Goals scored    || 69  ||  35 || 34
|-
|align=left| Goals conceded  || 45  ||  18 || 27
|-
|align=left| Goal difference ||+24  || +17 || +7
|-
|align=left| Top scorer      || Kapetanos (19) || 11 || 8
|-
|align=left| Winning rate    || % || % || %
|-

International appearances

Notes
 Bogdan Stancu was called for Romania's game against Hungary, but in the championship match was injured and Lucescu dropped him from team.
 Ciprian Tătărușanu was called for the Romania's game against Hungary and Faroe Islands, but was not capped.

Competitions

Overall

Liga I

League table

Results summary

Results by round

Matches

Cupa României

Results

UEFA Europa League

Qualifying rounds

Second qualifying round

Third qualifying round

Play-off round

Group stage

Results

Non competitive matches

UEFA Club rankings
This is the current UEFA Club Rankings, including season 2008–09.

Staff

Coaching staff

 (from 18 Sept.)
 (until 17 Sept.) (from 14 Sept) (until 17 Sept.)''

Other information

Notes and references

2009-10
Romanian football clubs 2009–10 season